Events in the year 1994 in  Turkey.

Parliament
19th Parliament of Turkey

Incumbents
President – Süleyman Demirel 
Prime Minister – Tansu Çiller 
Leader of the opposition – Mesut Yılmaz

Ruling party and the main opposition
 Ruling party – True Path Party (DYP)
 Main opposition – Motherland Party (ANAP)

Cabinet
50th government of Turkey

Events
10 January – CIA warned the Turkish prime minister Tansu Çiller about a possible assassination in Belgium
23 January – Terrorists killed 20 villagers in Mardin Province
26 January – Devaluation
13 March – Two Greek Cypriot tankers collided in Bosphorous.
27 March – Local elections
5 April – Economic rehabilitation program (known as bitter recipe) 
5 May – Weightlifter Naim Süleymanoğlu gained the title European champion
15 May – Galatasaray won the championship of the Turkish football league
10 August – First Turkish telecommunication satellite Turksat 1B
18 October – Turkic Council in İstanbul
8 November – Rahmi Koç was elected as the new president of the International Chamber of Commerce
19 November – Weightlifter Halil Mutlu broke 3 world records in 54 kg
20 November – Weightlifter Nain Süleymanoğlu broke 3 world records in 64 kg
29 December – Turkish Airlines Flight 278 crashed on approach to Van Ferit Melen Airport killing 57. Nineteen survived the incident.
 Full date unknown – 
Kuzeybatı real estate services firm is founded

Births
15 January – Sinan Gümüş, footballer
6 February – İbrahim Yılmaz, footballer
9 March – Okay Yokuşlu, footballer
12 March – Yusuf Emre Gültekin, footballer
1 May – İlkay Durmuş, footballer
25 May – Samed Yeşil, footballer

Deaths
20 January – Bedia Muvahhit (born in 1897), theatre actress
15 March – Mehmed Orhan (born in 1909), head of the Ottoman dynasty
14 May – Cihat Arman (born in 1919), footballer and coach
31 May – Uzay Heparı (born in 1969), musician

Gallery

See also
1993-94 1.Lig
Turkey at the 1994 Winter Olympics

References

 
Years of the 20th century in Turkey
Turkey
Turkey
Turkey